Daniel Gaysinsky (born September 3, 1994) is a Canadian karateka. He won the silver medal in the men's kumite +84 kg event at the 2019 Pan American Games held in Lima, Peru.

He represented Canada at the 2020 Summer Olympics in Tokyo, Japan. He competed in the men's +75 kg event.

Career

He won the gold medal in the men's kumite +84 kg event at the 2017 Pan American Karate Championships held in Curaçao. A year later, he won one of the bronze medals in his event at the 2018 Pan American Karate Championships held in Santiago, Chile.

In 2019, he won the silver medal in the men's kumite +84 kg event at the Pan American Games held in Lima, Peru. In the final, he lost against Brian Irr of the United States.

In 2021, he qualified at the World Olympic Qualification Tournament held in Paris, France to compete at the 2020 Summer Olympics in Tokyo, Japan.

Achievements

References

External links 
 
 

1994 births
Living people
Place of birth missing (living people)
Canadian male karateka
Pan American Games medalists in karate
Pan American Games silver medalists for Canada
Karateka at the 2019 Pan American Games
Medalists at the 2019 Pan American Games
Karateka at the 2020 Summer Olympics
Olympic karateka of Canada
21st-century Canadian people